Lucius Cornelius L. f. Merula was consul of the Roman Republic, along with Quintus Minucius Thermus, in 193 BC. His province was Gallia Cisalpina. Merula closed an active predatory campaign by a total defeat of the Boian Gauls in the neighbourhood of Mutina. Since his staff officer Marcus Claudius Marcellus accused him of a delay in sending forward a reserve unit, resulting in several thousand unnecessary casualties and the escape of many enemy soldiers, the senate refused him a triumph.

References
Livy, Ab Urbe Condita 34.54-57, 35.4-8

2nd-century BC Roman consuls
Merula, Lucius
Roman patricians